John Augustus Fritchey Hall (July 8, 1890 – March 9, 1949) was an American WWI sailor with the North Bombing Squadron, English teacher, lawyer, judicial appointee, and politician who served as Republican in the Pennsylvania House of Representatives and Mayor of Harrisburg, Pennsylvania. In 1947, Hall was president of the Dauphin County Bar Association. The Harrisburg Housing Authority, established in 1938, named the public housing complex John A. F. Hall Manor after Hall in 1953.

References

1890 births
1949 deaths
Mayors of Harrisburg, Pennsylvania
Members of the Pennsylvania House of Representatives